Mohamed Yehia Zakaria (born May 10, 1938) is an Emirati businessman of Egyptian origin. He is  the longest-serving chief executive of the beverage industry in the Middle East. He is the co-founder and was chief executive of Dubai Refreshments (Pepsi), in Dubai, and institutionalized the soft drink industry in the Middle East.

Education and career
A graduate of Cairo University with a bachelor's degree in Commerce, Mohamed Zakaria arrived in Dubai in 1960 to gain work experience and then  afterward, attend Michigan State University where he had been accepted for a MBA.  His previous work in Egypt at the Government Accountancy Department, promoted him to explore an offer he had gotten by the late Sultan bin Ali Al Owais, a philanthropist, poet, businessman and former Minister of the UAE. In early 1962  he was appointed the head accountant for the Al Owais family business.  Along with  Shaikh Rashid bin Saeed Al Maktoum the Al Owais, Al Mulla family and  Qais Bin Abdul Munaim Al Zawawi, he negotiated the deal to make Dubai the first place in the Middle East to bottle, distribute and market the Pepsi brand.

In 1974, along with the late Qais Bin Abdul Munaim Al Zawawi the Deputy Prime Minister for Economic and Financial Affairs of Oman,  the first soft drink and beverage manufacturer was brought to the Sultanate. He is its founder, and until 2006, the Managing Director.

He is also a founding member of the National Bank of Dubai in 1962, which later merged in 2009 to form Emirates NBD.

In 1980, along with Sheikh Rashid bin Saeed Al Maktoum and Sultan Al Owais he founded, Jeema Mineral Water Company. In 1999 he introduced private labeling to the region.

In 2000, under his leadership, Pepsi in Dubai captured 70% of the UAE market share and had its highest ever net profit of 17 AED million.

In 2002, Zakaria retired from active duty, although he still retains a significant share in the businesses he founded in both Dubai and Oman. Today he runs a real estate portfolio in Europe, the Middle East and Africa, and has stakes in active UAE and Omani based industries.

Family 
He married Shadia Shahwan (1944–1998) in 1966 and has 4 children, Ghada, Nashwa, May and Ahmed.  He has since remarried in 2006. His children hold active roles in Dubai and Abu Dhabi Government run companies, and  they also operate the day-to-day activities of the family business.

Positions held

References

External links

http://www.khaleejtimes.com/DisplayArticle.asp?xfile=data/theuae/2005/October/theuae_October17.xml&section=theuae&col=
https://www.youtube.com/watch?v=VVDIcpREQJo
HighBeam
http://www1.albawaba.com/ar/node/328943
http://www.pepsidrc.com
http://www.pepsioman.com
http://www.jeemawater.com

Living people
1938 births
Businesspeople in the drink industry
Cairo University alumni
Michigan State University alumni
Businesspeople from Dubai
Businesspeople from Cairo
Emirati accountants
Egyptian emigrants to the United Arab Emirates